Zhang Bo is a Chinese former competitive figure skater. She is a two-time Winter Universiade bronze medalist (1991, 1993).

She competed at three World Junior Championships in the 1980s, placing 13th at the 1988 edition in Brisbane, Australia. As a senior, she represented China at the 1993 World Championships in Prague, Czech Republic; she qualified to the final segment and finished 16th overall.

Competitive highlights

References 

1970s births
Chinese female single skaters
Universiade medalists in figure skating
Living people
Universiade bronze medalists for China
Competitors at the 1991 Winter Universiade
Competitors at the 1993 Winter Universiade